Acrojana salmonea is a moth in the family Eupterotidae. It was described by Rothschild in 1932. It is found in Nigeria.

References

Endemic fauna of Nigeria
Moths described in 1932
Janinae